Ambassadors in Spain are also accredited to Andorra.

List of Ambassadors

Rodica Radian-Gordon September 2019 -,
Daniel Kutner 2015 - 2019
Alon Bar (diplomat) 2011 - 2015
Raphael Schutz 2007 - 2011
Victor Harel 2003 - 2007
Herzl Inbar 1999 - 2003
Ehud Gol 1995 - 1999 (concurrently to Andorra, resident in Madrid)
Shlomo Ben-Ami1987 - 2001
Shmuel Hadas 1986 - 1987

References

Jewish Spanish history

Spain
Israel